Bahar-e-Shariat (1939) is an encyclopedia of Islamic fiqh (jurisprudence), according to the Hanafi school. Spreading over 20 volumes, Seventeen of its volumes were written by Amjad Ali Aazmi, a disciple of Ahmed Raza Khan. The final three books were compiled by his disciples after his death. The book is written in simple Urdu and has 11,624 topics.

There are separate parts for theology, prayer, ablution, fasting, charity and pilgrimage. The second part includes topics like Talaq (Divorce) and Khula, (trade matters involving buying and selling of goods) and Kufria sentences etc. Parts 14 to 20 are compiled in the third volume, which includes topics such as Inheritance, Qassas, Diyat etc. The topics encompassing the whole life of a person are discussed by the author. The book has been published by many publishers across India and Pakistan. Ilyas Qadri's Dawat-e-Islami has done work on a computerized version

See also
List of Sunni books
Kanzul Iman
Fatawa-e-Razvia
Husamul Haramain

References

External links 
Download Bahar-e-Shariat 
Read Online or Download PDFBahar-e-Shariat in Urdu 

Sunni literature
1939 non-fiction books
Sharia
Urdu-language encyclopedias
Hanafi literature
Books about Islamic jurisprudence
Encyclopedias of law
Encyclopedias of Islam
Barelvi literature
20th-century encyclopedias
20th-century Indian books
Indian non-fiction books
Indian religious texts
Indian encyclopedias
Books about Islam